Guillaume Musso (born 6 June 1974) is a French novelist. He is one of the most popular contemporary French authors.

Career

Musso was born in 1974 in Antibes (Alpes-Maritimes), France.  After finishing high school, he left for the United States at the age of 19. He spent several months in New York City, living with other young foreigners and earning money by selling ice-cream.  Then he came back to France, earned a degree in economics, and taught in high schools.
His first published novel, Skidamarink, a thriller that opens with the theft of the Mona Lisa from the Musée du Louvre, was published in 2001.

After a car accident he became interested in near-death experiences and imagined a story about a man who returns to life after touching death. This became the novel Afterwards... published in 2004 by XO Editions, which sold more than 1 million copies in France and has been translated into 23 languages. Afterwards, the film directed by Gilles Bourdos starring John Malkovich and Evangeline Lilly was released in France in January 2009 and then internationally.

Musso wrote A mix up in Heaven in 2005, Will you be there in 2006, Lost and Found in 2007, One Day, Perhaps in 2008, Where Would I Be Without You? in 2009,Girl on Paper in 2010 and Call from an Angel in 2011. In 2009, Musso was the #2 bestselling author in France, and according to a 2011 Edistat study he holds third place on the list of authors who have sold the most books in France since 2008, just after Stephenie Meyer and before Harlan Coben. Some 11 million copies of his novels have been sold worldwide and they have been translated into 34 languages.

Novels

Skidamarink, Éditions Anne Carrière, 2001 and Calmann-Lévy, 2020
Afterwards... (original title: Et après) XO Editions, 2004
A Mix-Up in Heaven (original title: Sauve-moi) XO Editions, 2005
Will You Be There? (original title: Seras-tu là?) XO Editions, 2006
Lost and Found (original title: Parce que je t'aime) XO Editions, 2007
One Day, Perhaps (original title: Je reviens te chercher) XO Editions, 2008
Where Would I Be Without You? (original title: Que serais-je sans toi ?) XO Editions, 2009
Girl on Paper (original title: La Fille de papier) XO Editions, 2010
Call from an Angel (original title: L'Appel de l'ange) XO Editions, 2011
Seven years later (original title: 7 ans après) XO Editions, 2013
Tomorrow (original title: Demain) XO Editions, 2013
Central Park XO Editions, 2014
This very instant (original title: L'instant présent) XO Edition, 2015
Brooklyn Girl (original title: La Fille de Brooklyn) XO Edition, 2016
Un appartement à Paris, XO Edition, 2017
La Jeune Fille et la Nuit, Calmann-Levy, 2018
La vie secrète des écrivains, Calmann-Lévy, 2019
La vie est un roman, Calmann-Lévy, 2020
L'Inconnue de la Seine, Calmann-Lévy, 2021

Awards
 , Award for the love novel Scrivere per Amore, Verone, 2005
 , Best adaptable novel for the cinema Prix du meilleur roman adaptable au cinéma, 2004

References

External links

 Personal Website
 Biography of Guillaume Musso on the Website VDS.fr (French language)

1974 births
Living people
People from Antibes
20th-century French novelists
21st-century French novelists
French schoolteachers
French male novelists
Chevaliers of the Ordre des Arts et des Lettres
Côte d'Azur University alumni
20th-century French male writers
21st-century French male writers